Thomas Bennett (11 October 1866 – 26 December 1942) was an Australian cricketer. He played one first-class match for South Australia in February 1895, losing to New South Wales at the Sydney Cricket Ground.

References

External links
 

1866 births
1942 deaths
Australian cricketers
South Australia cricketers
Cricketers from Adelaide